Armenia competed at the 2022 European Championships in Munich from August 11 to August 22, 2022.

Medallists

Competitors
The following is the list of number of competitors in the Championships:

Athletics

Canoeing

Men

Cycling

Road

Men

Track

Omnium

Points race

Gymnastics

Men

Armenia has entered five male athletes.

Qualification

Individual finals

References

2022
Nations at the 2022 European Championships
2022 in Armenian sport